In Side Out is the fourth album by psychedelic rock group, Edgar Broughton Band. The album was originally released as "Harvest SHTC 252" in July 1972. The 2004 CD reissue features three bonus tracks.

Track listing

"Get Out of Bed / There's Nobody There / Side by Side" (Robert Edgar Broughton, Steve Broughton) – 3:42
"Sister Angela" (R. E. Broughton) – 0:40
"I Got Mad" (R. E. Broughton, Victor Unitt) – 3:45
"They Took It Away" (S. Broughton) – 2:27
"Homes Fit for Heroes" (R. E. Broughton) – 4:18
"Gone Blue" (Arthur Grant, R. E. Broughton) – 3:14
"Chilly Morning Mama" (R. E. Broughton) – 4:32
"The Rake" (R. E. Broughton) – 2:42
"Totin' This Guitar" (R. E. Broughton) – 1:46
"Double Agent" (S. Broughton) – 2:53
"It's Not You" (R. E. Broughton, S. Broughton, Grant, Unitt) – 11:10
"Rock 'n' Roll" (R. E. Broughton, Unitt) – 2:56

2004 CD reissue bonus tracks
"Someone" (R. E. Broughton) – 3:45 (B-side of "Harvest HAR 5049") 
"Mr. Crosby" (S. Broughton) – 2:09 (B-side of "Harvest HAR 5049")
"Look at the Mayor" – 9:42 (Live at "The Sundown Mile End", previously unreleased)

Personnel
Edgar Broughton Band
Edgar Broughton – vocals, guitar
Arthur Grant – bass guitar, vocals
Steve Broughton – drums, vocals
Victor Unitt – guitars, vocals

Production
The Edgar Broughton Band – producers
Alan O'Duffy – engineer
Hipgnosis - cover design, photography 

Edgar Broughton Band albums
1972 albums
Harvest Records albums
Albums with cover art by Hipgnosis
albums recorded at Morgan Sound Studios
Repertoire Records albums